Sakura Hauge, also known as , is a Norwegian-born Japanese handball goalkeeper for ESBF Besançon and the Japanese national team.

Club career
Hauge began her career playing for the Bergen-based club IL Gneist, before joining the club Stabæk IF in Oslo. After Stabæk, she played for Nordstrand IF. Beginning in 2007, Hauge played for the club Tertnes HE in Bergen for seven seasons. In 2014, she joined the club Vipers Kristiansand in Kristiansand, signing a two-year contract. Hauge signed a new two-year contract with Vipers Kristiansand in 2016.

National teams
From 2003 to 2005 Hauge played eight matches for the Norway women's national youth handball team. Before that she had played 14 matches for the junior handball team. Although amongst the players chosen for the Norway women's national handball team in the 2010 European Women's Handball Championship, and being a candidate for the Norwegian team at the 2012 Summer Olympics, she then did not play for Norway on a national level before 2014. In 2014 Hauge played two recruit level matches against Sweden, in one of which she was declared Most Valuable Player. In the early 2010s Hauge suffered from jumper's knee.

Citing disillusionment with her lack of prospects at the Norwegian national team, Hauge joined the Japan women's national handball team in 2015, having contacted the Japanese team the previous year. When playing for Japan, she is known as Sakura Kametani. She played three matches for Japan in the 2015 World Women's Handball Championship in Denmark, where Japan ended on 19th place.

In the 2017 World Women's Handball Championship in Germany, she was the leading goalkeeper throughout the tournament for Japan. She played all 6 matches and also scored her first goal for the national team. In the last match, the eight-finals against Netherlands, she was named player of the match after Japan lost 24–26 after extra time.

Achievements
EHF Cup: 
Finalist: 2018
Norwegian League:
Winner: 2017/2018 (Vipers)
Norwegian Cup:
Winner: 2017
Finalist: 2013
Danish Cup:
Winner: 2018
Carpathian Trophy:
Winner: 2019

Individual awards
 Carpathian Trophy Best Goalkeeper: 2019

Personal life
Hauge was born in Bergen, Norway, to a Japanese mother and a Norwegian father. She grew up in her father's home town of Bergen. In primary and secondary school, she received Japanese language lessons (mother tongue instruction). During her childhood, the family would holiday in Hauge's mother's home town of Okayama. From age 15 to 20, she lived in Oslo.

References

External links

1987 births
Living people
Norwegian female handball players
Japanese female handball players
Sportspeople from Bergen
Norwegian people of Japanese descent
Japanese people of Norwegian descent
Expatriate handball players
Handball players at the 2020 Summer Olympics